Pedro Fernández de Castro may  refer to:
Pedro Fernández de Castro (Grand Master of the Order of Santiago) 
Pedro Fernández de Castro (died 1214), Castilian nobleman
Pedro Fernández de Castro (died 1342) was a Galician nobleman and military leader.
Pedro Fernández de Castro, Count of Lemos, 17th-century nobleman